Joshua Anthony Frydenberg (born 17 July 1971) is an Australian former politician who served as the treasurer of Australia and deputy leader of the Liberal Party from 2018 to 2022. He also served as a member of parliament (MP) for the division of Kooyong from 2010 to 2022.

After leaving university, Frydenberg served as an adviser to Prime Minister John Howard and Foreign Minister Alexander Downer during the Howard Government. He also worked for Deutsche Bank until his election to the Australian House of Representatives at the 2010 federal election. Quickly appointed to the frontbench, he went on to serve in several ministerial roles during the Abbott and Turnbull governments from 2013 to 2018, including as Minister for Resources and Minister for the Environment and Energy. In August 2018, he was elected as deputy leader of the Liberal Party following a leadership spill, which saw Scott Morrison elected as leader and prime minister. Morrison subsequently appointed Frydenberg as Treasurer.   

At the 2022 federal election, Frydenberg suffered a significant swing against him, and lost his seat to the teal independent candidate Monique Ryan. Frydenberg became the first sitting treasurer to lose his seat since Ted Theodore at the 1931 election. After leaving politics, he became an advisor at investment bank Goldman Sachs.

Early life and education
Frydenberg was born in Melbourne and educated at Bialik and Mount Scopus Colleges. His mother, Erika Strausz, is a psychologist and University of Melbourne professor and his father Harry is a general surgeon. His mother was a Jewish Hungarian born in 1943 who arrived in Australia in 1950 as a stateless child from a refugee camp after escaping the Holocaust. His father is also Jewish; his grandparents emigrated to Australia from Poland in the 1930s.

Throughout his childhood, Frydenberg was a keen tennis player. He lobbied his parents, unsuccessfully, to drop out of high school to pursue a career in tennis. When they refused, Frydenberg stuck up a handwritten sign on his bedroom:  “the pain of discipline is far easier than the pain of regret". After finishing high school, he took a gap year to play tennis full-time in Australia and Europe. Frydenberg played against Mark Philippoussis and Pat Rafter, and represented Australia at two World University Games. He and his father were present at the 1997 Maccabiah bridge collapse.

Frydenberg completed honours degrees in economics and law at Monash University, where he became president of the Law Students Society, before working at Mallesons Stephen Jaques, a large Australian commercial law firm. Frydenberg won both a Fulbright Scholarship to attend Yale University and a Commonwealth Scholarship to attend the University of Oxford. He opted to accept the latter, completing a Master of International Relations at University College, Oxford, with a thesis on Indonesian politics. While deciding between Oxford and Yale, he was introduced to and developed friendships with Greg Hunt, a Fulbright Scholar and future cabinet colleague, and Sir Zelman Cowen, a former Australian governor-general and Oxford provost. He was introduced to the latter through their mutual friend Steven Skala. Cowen "became a mentor to Frydenberg and they spent many Sundays together discussing literature, music, philosophy and law". While at Oxford, Frydenberg was a member of the Oxford University L'Chaim Society.

Frydenberg has also earned a Master of Public Administration from the John F. Kennedy School of Government at Harvard University.

Frydenberg is one of seven Liberal MPs in the 46th Parliament of Australia who have obtained degrees at an Oxbridge or Ivy League university, the others being Alan Tudge, Angus Taylor, Andrew Laming, Dave Sharma, Greg Hunt and Paul Fletcher.

Early career

In 1999, Frydenberg worked as an assistant adviser to Attorney-General Daryl Williams before becoming an adviser to Foreign Affairs Minister Alexander Downer, a post he held until 2003. From 2003 to 2005 he was a policy adviser to Prime Minister John Howard, specialising in domestic security issues, border protection, justice and industrial relations. In 2005 he took up a position as a Director of Global Banking with Deutsche Bank in the company's Melbourne office.

2006 preselection attempt
In 2006, Frydenberg announced that he was seeking Liberal preselection for Kooyong, a safe Liberal seat in Melbourne's eastern suburbs. He was contesting it against the incumbent member, Petro Georgiou, who had held the seat since 1994.

In the days leading to the preselection convention, Queensland frontbenchers Ian Macfarlane, Peter Dutton and Santo Santoro backed Frydenberg's credentials, for which they were criticised by former Victorian Premier Jeff Kennett.

Georgiou won the nomination by gaining 62 of the 85 delegates' votes, with Frydenberg receiving 22 votes and a third candidate, Alastair Armstrong, receiving one vote. After Frydenberg's defeat, federal Treasurer and deputy Liberal leader Peter Costello, who represented the neighbouring seat of Higgins, encouraged Frydenberg to run for pre-selection in Chisholm, a marginal electorate neighbouring Kooyong, held by Anna Burke of the ALP. Frydenberg declined the offer, saying, "This is where I am from, this is where I feel most comfortable and this is where I think there is real work to be done."

After Georgiou announced his decision to retire at the 2010 election, Frydenberg won the preselection vote, defeating industrial lawyer John Pesutto. Frydenberg's candidacy was supported by references from former Prime Minister John Howard and former Opposition Leader Andrew Peacock.

Member of Parliament

Georgiou retired ahead of the 2010 federal election. With the support of former Liberal state president Michael Kroger, Frydenberg won Liberal preselection, and went on to win the seat with 52.56% of the primary vote and 57.55% of the two-party-preferred vote. He was only the fifth person to represent this traditionally safe non-Labor seat in 88 years. He held the seat that was once held by Australia's longest-serving Prime Minister, Robert Menzies.

The first Jewish Liberal elected to the House of Representatives, in his maiden speech, Frydenberg recounted the story of his Jewish grandparents' and great aunt's migration to Australia from Nazi controlled Europe and lauded the contribution of migrants to communities within his electorate. He enunciated his belief in small government, called for stronger ties with Asia while also maintaining a solid alliance with the US and proposed a target of having two Australian universities within the world's top ten by 2030.

Frydenberg is a member of the centre-right faction of the Liberal Party.

Frydenberg has at times been the target of antisemitic attacks, such as defacing his election material with Nazi icons.

Abbott Government

At the 2013 federal election, Frydenberg was re-elected with the largest swing to the Liberal Party in the seat since 1975. He was sworn in as a Parliamentary Secretary to the Prime Minister on 18 September 2013, with particular responsibility for the government's deregulation agenda. On 23 December 2014, Frydenberg was sworn in as Assistant Treasurer in a ministerial reshuffle and replaced Arthur Sinodinos, who resigned due to delays in an ICAC inquiry.

Turnbull Government

Following the September 2015 Liberal leadership ballot where Malcolm Turnbull became the Prime Minister, Frydenberg was appointed the Minister for Resources, Energy and Northern Australia in the First Turnbull Ministry. In February 2016, the Nationals Matt Canavan took over responsibility for Northern Australia in the rearranged ministry.

In 2015, he declared that he had switched positions regarding same-sex marriage and publicly supported same sex marriage.

With the re-election of the Turnbull Government in 2016, Frydenberg became the Minister for the Environment and Energy in the Second Turnbull Ministry.

Parliamentary eligibility
In the years following the 2016 election, numerous members of parliament were deemed to be ineligible to sit in parliament due to them breaching Section 44 of the Constitution of Australia, which prohibits MPs from having dual citizenship.

In the course of the 2017-18 Australian parliamentary eligibility crisis, suggestions were raised that Frydenberg might be in breach of Section 44, as his mother and her family had come to Australia as refugees from Hungary and was stateless at the time, but subsequently Hungary conferred citizenship by descent, which may have applied to Frydenberg. Documents from the National Archives show that Frydenberg's grandparents and mother were considered "Hungarian" when they arrived in Australia, but had applied for a certificate of exemption, listing their nationality as "stateless". 

Labor Party MPs were split on whether the matter should be investigated:  Mark Dreyfus indicated that he would pursue the matter, but other Labor MPs requested that he desist. Ed Husic said that he felt uncomfortable with his party questioning the legal citizenship of stateless Jewish refugees escaping Europe. Mark Butler stated that it was not the party's official position to pursue the matter.

Following the 2019 election, Frydenberg was taken to court over the issue by a constituent, Michael Staindl. In March 2020, the Federal Court ruled that Frydenberg was eligible to sit in parliament. Frydenberg was awarded legal costs of $410,000 against Staindl, of which Staindl paid him $350,000.  In July 2022, the Federal Court approved a settlement in which Staindl would make no further statement disparaging Frydenberg or his lawyers and no further payment would be required.

Morrison Government

Two leadership spills were carried out by the Liberal Party in August 2018, with the second resulting in Treasurer Scott Morrison replacing Malcolm Turnbull as party leader and prime minister. Julie Bishop did not seek re-election as deputy leader, and in the resulting ballot Frydenberg won a majority in the first round with 46 votes, while Trade Minister Steven Ciobo received 20 and Health Minister Greg Hunt received 16. During Morrison's subsequent press conference, he announced that Frydenberg would replace him as Treasurer.

Frydenberg delivered his first federal budget in April 2019. At the 2019 federal election, he retained his seat of Kooyong with a reduced majority, following a challenge from high-profile Greens candidate Julian Burnside. Perceiving Burnside as a strong contender, the Liberal Party doubled its spending on the campaign in Kooyong, from $500,000 to $1 million. Frydenberg received a primary swing of -8.2% against him, as well as the lowest Liberal vote in Kooyong in 97 years.

In July 2019 a Kooyong resident petitioned the High Court, as Court of Disputed Returns, for a ruling that Frydenberg had been ineligible owing to foreign citizenship, being allegedly a citizen of Hungary. On 23 November 2019 it was reported that Frydenberg had received confirmation from the Hungarian government that no record could be found of Hungarian citizenship of himself or his mother. On 12 December 2019, since factual as well as legal questions remained unresolved, Justice Gordon of the High Court (who was critical of parties' delay) referred the case to the Federal Court. On 17 March 2020, a Full Court of the Federal Court found on the basis of expert evidence that Frydenberg's maternal family had lost their Hungarian citizenship upon leaving Hungary, so that he was not and had never been a Hungarian citizen, and consequently he was not ineligible to be elected to the federal parliament.

In the lead-up to the 2022 election, Frydenberg's marginal seat of Kooyong faced a significant challenge by independent candidate Monique Ryan, who was a part of the "teal independent" movement. At the election on 21 May, Frydenberg lost his seat to Ryan, and he conceded defeat two days later. Frydenberg's loss would mark the first time that the seat of Kooyong would not be held by the Liberal Party or its predecessors since its inception in 1901.

Frydenberg reportedly had a close working relationship with Morrison and "often stayed overnight at Kirribilli".

Life after politics
In June, 2022, it was rumoured that Frydenberg was in the running to become next AFL CEO after the resignation of Gillon McLachlan, Frydenberg was quoted in saying that he is "looking at different private sector options". Eventually, Frydenberg joined investment bank Goldman Sachs as a senior regional advisor for the Asia Pacific.

Personal life
Frydenberg is married to Amie, and has two children, Gemma and Blake.

Frydenberg is a supporter of the Carlton Football Club, and served as the club's number-one ticket holder for 2021 and 2022. In 2019, he was the Melbourne Storm number-one ticket holder.

See also
 List of Jewish members of Australian parliaments

References

External links
 
 

|-

|-

 
|-

1971 births
Living people
21st-century Australian politicians
Abbott Government
Alumni of University College, Oxford
Australian investment bankers
Australian public servants
Australian people of Polish-Jewish descent
Australian people of Hungarian-Jewish descent
Businesspeople from Melbourne
Government ministers of Australia
Jewish Australian politicians
Harvard Kennedy School alumni
Liberal Party of Australia members of the Parliament of Australia
Members of the Australian House of Representatives for Kooyong
Members of the Cabinet of Australia
Monash Law School alumni
Morrison Government
Politicians from Melbourne
Treasurers of Australia
Turnbull Government